Cannabis in Guadeloupe is illegal, but is cultivated and transported illicitly. A 2007 report noted the prevalence of cannabis among youth in Guadeloupe at 7%.

Trafficking
Cannabis grown on the Windward Islands is transported to Guadeloupe, where it commands a higher price. Guadeloupe is located amongst several major cannabis producers, and thus serves as an entry point to the cannabis markets in Europe and North America.

References

 Guadeloupe
Politics of Guadeloupe
Guadeloupe
Guadeloupe